Neil Brunton (born 3 January 1969) is a former Australian rules football player with the Sydney Swans of the Australian Football League (AFL). He was plucked from the Sydney AFL competition during the middle of the 1991 season where he was playing with Holroyd-Parramatta Blacktown to make his debut against Geelong in Round 4 at Kardinia Park.

After playing 71 matches for the Swans, Neil was captain-coach of the Campbelltown Football Club leading them to the 1999 Sydney AFL premiership. After a break from coaching, Neil returned to coach Campbelltown at the start of the 2013 season.

Post-AFL
Neil Brunton is currently a primary school teacher at Scots College Brighton-le-sands in Dolls Points NSW. 

He is also in a coaching position with the Sydney Swans Academy.

References

Holmesby, Russell and Main, Jim (2007). The Encyclopedia of AFL Footballers. 7th ed. Melbourne: Bas Publishing.

Living people
1969 births
Sydney Swans players
Australian rules footballers from New South Wales
New South Wales Australian rules football State of Origin players
Staff of Newington College